As the Palaces Burn is the third studio album by American heavy metal band Lamb of God, released under Prosthetic Records on May 6, 2003. The album was produced by Devin Townsend and the band itself, and received considerably more airplay than their previous effort, with three singles. As of 2013, As The Palaces Burn has sold 270,000 copies since its original release, according to Nielsen SoundScan.

The band released a 10th anniversary edition of the album on November 11, 2013, with all songs in the album being remixed and remastered, alongside three bonus demo tracks. The 10th-anniversary edition of the album sold around 6,400 copies in the United States in its first week of release to land at position No. 64 on Billboard 200 chart.

Accolades
In 2017, Rolling Stone put As the Palaces Burn at #86 on their Top 100 Greatest Metal Albums of All Time list with Dan Epstein praising Devin Townsend's production which helped sharpen the guitar riffs on songs like "Vigil", "Ruin" and "11th Hour".

Track listing

Personnel

Lamb of God
Randy Blythe – vocals
Mark Morton – lead guitar
Willie Adler – rhythm guitar
John Campbell – bass
Chris Adler – drums

Additional musicians
Chris Poland – guitar on "Purified"
Devin Townsend – backing vocals and guitar on "A Devil in God's Country"
Steve Austin – backing vocals on "11th Hour"

Additional personnel
Devin Townsend – production, engineering
Shaun Thingvold – mixing
Josh Wilbur - mixing (10th Anniversary Edition)
Louie Teran – mastering
Brad Blackwood - mastering (10th Anniversary Edition)
Carla Lewis, Dan Kearley, Dennis Solomon, Grant Rutledge, Scott Cooke – assistant engineers
Petar Sardelich – engineer for Chris Poland
 – artwork
Adam Wentworth – picture disc artwork redesign

Release history

Charts

References

2003 albums
Lamb of God (band) albums
Black Market Activities albums
Prosthetic Records albums
Albums produced by Devin Townsend
Death metal albums by American artists